AGS Entertainment is an Indian film production, distribution company and multiplex chain in Chennai, Tamil Nadu. It was established in 2006 by three brothers Kalpathi S. Aghoram, Kalpathi S.Ganesh and Kalpathi S. Suresh.

History
AGS Entertainment ventured into film production in 2006 with Susi Ganesan's Thiruttu Payale, which was followed by Santosh Subramaniam, both emerging commercial successes. Their subsequent productions included the masala flick Maasilamani, Chimbudevan's Western comedy Irumbukkottai Murattu Singam, the period piece Madrasapattinam, Bale Pandiya, Myshkin's crime thriller Yudham Sei, Bala's comedy entertainer Avan Ivan, Prabhu Deva directed romance film Engeyum Kadhal, Vellore Maavattam starring Nandha, the K. V. Anand-Suriya project Maattrraan and Atlee directed sports action film Bigil, while the distribution of films includes Kandhakottai , Inidhu Inidhu, Mynaa and Payanam.

Productions

Distribution

References

External links
Official Site

Indian companies established in 2006
Film production companies based in Chennai
2006 establishments in Tamil Nadu
Organizations established in 2006
Mass media companies established in 2006